The Cloud Dream of the Nine (Hangul: 구운몽, Hanja: 九雲夢) by Kim Man-jung is a 17th-century Korean novel set in the Chinese Tang Dynasty (although there have been some arguments about whether Kim was the original author ). It has been called “one of the most beloved masterpieces in Korean literature." It was the first literary work from Korea to be translated into English, by James Scarth Gale in 1922. Richard Rutt's 1974 translation is entitled A Nine Cloud Dream. In 2019, Penguin Classics published a new translation by Heinz Insu Fenkl entitled The Nine Cloud Dream.

The Cloud Dream of the Nine is written in a philosophical style, expressing Confucianist and Buddhist concepts. In the preface of the book (first written in 1922), Elspet K.R. Scott describes the book as being about the romance of polygamy; others believe that it is meant to be a cautionary tale about the illusory nature of Earthly delights and the fleeting nature of the fulfilment of "libidinous drives".

The oldest existing text of the book was written in Classical Chinese.

In popular culture
Uhm Jung-hwa's 2017 studio album The Cloud Dream Of The Nine is named after the novel.

External links

References

Buddhist novels
Joseon dynasty works
17th-century Korean novels
Novels set in the Tang dynasty
Chinese-language novels of Korea